Giolou is a village in the Paphos District of Cyprus, located 20 km North of Paphos and 15 km South of Polis Chrysochous. At an altitude of about 300 meters from the sea, the settlement of Giolou is connected to the southwest and north to the main road that leads to Polis Chrysochous and Latsi, which in fact led to the identification of its name with the Turkish Cypriot word “yiol” (which means road) and later with the wind god, Aeolus. The most prevalent version for the origins of its name, however, mentions the name of the feudal owner who had the village in his possession during the Byzantium era or during the period of the Frankish rule. 

It borders with Loukrounou, Simou, Drymou, Stroumbi, Theletra and Miliou villages.

The village is mentioned by the historians from the Byzantine and Frankish periods.

The village is also known as “fox Village” because the residents used to hunt foxes for living.

Topography 
Giolou is located 305 m above sea level.

Nearby 
If fishing is your game, then take the short trip to the Evretou Dam, or if you fancy a few rounds of gold, Tsada golf course is a short drive away.

For other entertainment in Giolou, the football stadium is often used to host plays, festivals, and even the odd football match. Giolou has its very own football academy and the local team was recently combined with the team at Mesogi to become United Athletic. The team is currently in the third division.

References

Communities in Paphos District